Yayuk Basuki and Nicole Bradtke were the defending champions but did not compete that year.

Helena Suková and Natasha Zvereva won in the final 6–1, 6–1 against Elena Likhovtseva and Ai Sugiyama.

Seeds
Champion seeds are indicated in bold text while text in italics indicates the round in which those seeds were eliminated.

 Helena Suková /  Natasha Zvereva (champions)
 Alexandra Fusai /  Nathalie Tauziat (quarterfinals)
 Alexia Dechaume-Balleret /  Sandrine Testud (semifinals)
 Laura Montalvo /  Paola Suárez (first round)

Draw

External links
 1997 Internationaux de Strasbourg Doubles Draw 

1997
1997 WTA Tour